The islands of Massachusetts range from barren, almost completely submerged rocks in Massachusetts Bay (e.g. Abbott Rock, first on the list below) to the large, famous and heavily visited Martha's Vineyard and Nantucket.

The recent history of Massachusetts' islands includes creation by flooding, connection to the mainland and subsumption into new land. Several islands existed as hills in western Worcester County and eastern Hampshire County until the 1930s, when the Swift River was dammed amid controversy to create the Quabbin Reservoir to meet demand for water in the Boston metropolitan area. Castle Island, Deer Island and Nut Island, all in Boston Harbor, have been attached to the mainland and remain islands in name only. Castle and Nut Islands now form the ends of peninsulas due to land reclamation, while Deer Island was attached to Winthrop Peninsula by the New England Hurricane of 1938. Governors Island and Apple Island now constitute the land underneath the runways and tarmacs of Logan International Airport and are included in this list despite their disappearance. Many of the Boston Harbor islands that are located under Logan's flight paths are part of the Boston Harbor Islands National Recreation Area.

Although most of the islands are in or near the Atlantic Ocean, several islands in western Massachusetts are found in the Connecticut River and a few others are surrounded by natural or man made lakes, ponds and wetlands.

See also
Islands of the Northeast United States

References

Massachusetts
Massachusetts geography-related lists